Cooper-Alley House, also known as the George Alley Residence, is a historic home located in Noble Township, Shelby County, Indiana. It was built in 1863–1864, and is a two-story, rectangular, brick farmhouse with Greek Revival and Italianate style design elements.  It has a gable roof and sits on a stone foundation.  A one-story rear addition was built in the late-19th century.

It was listed on the National Register of Historic Places in 1982.

References

Houses on the National Register of Historic Places in Indiana
Greek Revival houses in Indiana
Italianate architecture in Indiana
Houses completed in 1864
Buildings and structures in Shelby County, Indiana
National Register of Historic Places in Shelby County, Indiana
1864 establishments in Indiana